Mazlo is a jewellery house of Lebanese origin, established in Paris, France, since 1977.

Its origins date back to the fifteenth century, when the founder of the dynasty, 
Georgius Sayegh el-Mazloum, left Lebanon to settle in Venice.

Since the early-1970s, the house has been based in Paris and headed by Robert Mazloum, or Mazlo. A goldsmith and jeweller, he continued the family's traditions by creating one-of-a-kind bespoke jewellery pieces.

Along with his Haute Joaillerie pieces, he develops a line of prayer beads called "Masbahas" for the Gulf countries, distributed in Tanagra concept stores.

Notes

See also
 Maximos III Mazloum, relative.

References

Further reading 
 Classluxury.net. "Il gruppo Chalhoub presenta il nuovo concept" (text in italian), 14 October 2013. 
 Les Annonces de la Seine, October 18, 2012 issue (text in french). 
 Russian Emirates, November–December 2011 issue, (interview in russian). 
 Al-Bayan, issue released on November 11, 2011, (interview in arabic). 
 Balsom, Simon. "The alchemist: Robert Mazlo", Men's passion, October  2011.
 Al-Watan TV, 16 March 2010, Interview, Tanagra's 30th Anniversary.
 C. Robin, 2011. "Il était une fois la Joaillerie", Revue ARKETIP
 A-C. Catineau, 2004, "Penchés sur le métier", BBI

External links 
  

Jewellery companies of France
French companies established in 1977
Design companies established in 1977
French brands
French jewellery designers